A spiritual successor (sometimes called a spiritual sequel) is a product or fictional work that is similar to, or directly inspired by, another previous work, but (unlike a traditional prequel or sequel) does not explicitly continue the product line or media franchise of its predecessor, and is thus only a successor "in spirit". Spiritual successors often have similar themes and styles to their source material, but are generally a distinct intellectual property.

In fiction, the term generally refers to a work by a creator that shares similarities to one of their earlier works, but is set in a different continuity, and features distinct characters and settings. Such works may arise when licensing issues prevent a creator from releasing a direct sequel using the same copyrighted characters and names as the original.

The term is also used more broadly to describe a pastiche work that intentionally evokes similarities to pay homage to other influential works, but is also distinct enough to avoid copyright infringement.

In literature
Arthur Conan Doyle's Sherlock Holmes stories, published between 1887 and 1927, drew a large number of pastiches from other authors as early as the 1900s to capture the same mystery and spirit as Doyle's writings. Subsequently, Doyle and his publishers, and since then Doyle's estate, had aggressive enforced copyright on the Holmes character, often requiring authors that were publishing stories to change any use of Holmes' name to something else. The name "Herlock Sholmes" became one of the more common variations on this, notably in Maurice Leblanc's Arsène Lupin versus Herlock Sholmes, with the Sholmes character having a personality similar, but not quite exactly like Holmes to further distance potential copyright issues. In and around the 1950s, the character Solar Pons, a pastiche of Holmes, appeared in several books not authorized by the estate of Conan Doyle. These copyright issues have continued into contemporary times: in the case Klinger v. Conan Doyle Estate, Ltd. (2014), it was determined that due to copyright laws, the characters of Holmes and Watson remained under copyright until 2023, making spiritual successors using these characters by name violations of the Doyle estate's copyright.

In films and television 
In films and television shows, spiritual successor often describes similar works by the same creator, or starring the same cast. For example, the show Parks and Recreation is a spiritual successor to The Office. Both are workplace mockumentaries developed by Greg Daniels, featuring satirical humor, and characters being filmed by an in-universe documentary film crew.

The film 10 Cloverfield Lane was not originally scripted with any connection to Cloverfield. When the film was acquired by Bad Robot Productions, producer J. J. Abrams recognized a common element of a giant monster attack between the two films, and chose to market 10 Cloverfield Lane as a spiritual successor to Cloverfield to help bring interest to the newer film, which allowed him to establish a franchise he could build upon in the future.

The 2002 series Ozzy & Drix, is also a spiritual successor to Osmosis Jones.

Spiritual successors are common in Indian film industries, particularly Bollywood, where films marketed as sequels do not share continuity with their predecessors.

The 2022 film Chip 'n Dale: Rescue Rangers was created as a spiritual sequel to 1988 film Who Framed Roger Rabbit, both films showcases worlds where cartoon characters coexist with humans.

In video games

Games by the same studio
Spiritual successor games are sometimes made by the same studio as the original, but with a new title due to licensing issues. Some examples of these include:

 The Dark Souls series by FromSoftware was inspired by the studio's earlier game, Demon's Souls, an exclusive title for the PlayStation 3. Because Sony Interactive Entertainment held the rights to Demon's Souls, the studio was unable to produce a direct sequel on other platforms, leading them to create a new property with similar gameplay mechanics.
 Irrational Games' BioShock is a spiritual successor to their earlier System Shock 2. While System Shock 2 was met with critical acclaim, it was considered a commercial failure, and publisher Electronic Arts would not allow a third title in the series. After several years and other projects at Irrational, as well as being acquired by a new publisher 2K Games, the studio developed BioShock, with a similar free-form narrative structure.
 Shadow of the Colossus was considered a spiritual successor to Ico by Fumito Ueda, who directed both games as leader of Team Ico. Ueda expressed that he did not necessarily want a direct canonical connection between the games, but that both had similar narrative themes and elements that he wanted players to interpret on their own.
 Red Dead Redemption, developed by Rockstar San Diego, is a spiritual successor to the studio's 2004 game Red Dead Revolver.
 Back 4 Blood, developed by Turtle Rock Studios, is a spiritual successor to the Left 4 Dead series, developed by Turtle Rock Studios and Valve.

Games by the same staff
Alternatively, a successor may be developed by some of the staff who worked on the preceding game, under a new studio name. Examples of these include:

 Yooka-Laylee is a spiritual successor evoking the style and gameplay of Rare's Banjo-Kazooie. It was developed by Playtonic Games, which consisted of many former Rare staff members, including composer Grant Kirkhope. Yooka and Laylee, the game's animal protagonists, serve as direct stand-ins for the original game's Banjo and Kazooie.
 Mighty No. 9 closely resembles the gameplay and character design of the Mega Man series, which project lead Keiji Inafune worked on before leaving Capcom, and is considered a spiritual successor.
 Bloodstained: Ritual of the Night is considered a spiritual successor to the Castlevania series, created by Koji Igarashi who had led development of several Castlevania games before leaving Konami.
 A number of games from Bullfrog Productions have spawned spiritual successors in the years after the studio was closed by Electronic Arts in 2001, with these projects typically led by former staff from Bullfrog having found their own studios. These include Godus by Peter Molyneux's studio 22cans, succeeding Populous; 5 Lives Studios' Satellite Reign, succeeding Syndicate Wars; and Two Point Hospital by Mark Webley and Gary Carr's Two Point Studios, succeeding Theme Hospital.
 P.N.03 has been called the spiritual predecessor of Bayonetta for its "combat...with stylish dance-inspired movements" and "flashy, energetic, intense" gameplay and character design. P.N.03 director Shinji Mikami later co-founded PlatinumGames, the studio that developed Bayonetta, and Bayonetta director and PlatinumGames co-founder Hideki Kamiya also directed Resident Evil 2, Devil May Cry, and Viewtiful Joe, the last of which was part of the Capcom Five with P.N.03.

Common themes only
The term is also more broadly applied to video games developed by a different studio with no connection to the first, and is simply inspired by the gameplay, aesthetics or other elements of the preceding work. Examples of such games include:

 The game Cities: Skylines (along with other city-builder games) is considered a spiritual successor to the SimCity series, both focusing on constructing and managing a simulated city.
 Axiom Verge is a side-scrolling Metroidvania game that succeeds the Metroid series.
 Mother and EarthBound have directly inspired a number of pixel-art, role-playing indie games featuring children in playable character roles as spiritual successors to the series. These include Undertale and Citizens of Earth.
 War for the Overworld (succeeding Dungeon Keeper) crossed through several of these categories over the course of the development. Originating as a fan-made direct sequel to Dungeon Keeper 2, the game then became a spiritual successor with only thematic connection after moving away from the Dungeon Keeper IP. Finally, the hiring of returning voice actor Richard Ridings presented a direct staff connection to the original.

Other
 Planet Zoo and Planet Coaster are spiritual successors to Zoo Tycoon and RollerCoaster Tycoon, having a theme similar to these games.

In sports 
In sports, the Ravens–Steelers rivalry is considered the spiritual successor to the older Browns–Steelers rivalry due to the original Cleveland Browns relocation to Baltimore, as well as the reactivated Browns having a 6–30 record against the Steelers since returning to the league in 1999.

In other industries 
The Honda CR-Z is regarded as the spiritual successor to the second generation Honda CR-X in both name and exterior design, despite a nearly two decade time difference in production. The Toyota Fortuner SUV is a spiritual successor to the Toyota 4Runner SUV mainly because they both share the same platform as the Hilux pickup truck. The Canon Cat computer was Jef Raskin's spiritual successor to the Apple Macintosh.

See also 
 Canon (fiction)
 Continuation novel
 Phoenix club (sports)
 Reboot (fiction)
 Remake
 Revisionism (fictional)
 Sequel
 Spin-off (media)
 Gaiden
 Digression

References 

Spiritual successor
Sequel, spiritual
Film and video terminology
Game terminology